The River Wiske is a tributary of the River Swale in Yorkshire, England. The Wiske gives its name to several villages it passes through. The name Wiske is derived from an Old English word wisca meaning a water meadow. It was once known as the Foulbroke, a name for which some writers commented that it was well deserved.

The river was maintained by the River Wiske Internal Drainage Board, which was part of the Shires Group of IDBs. It is within the national character areas (NCAs) of the Vale of Mowbray and the Tees Lowlands.

Course

The river becomes the Wiske at the confluence of Carr Beck and Stony Lane Beck south of Ingleby Arncliffe close to the Tontine Bridge where the A19 and A172 roads diverge. It flows north in a series of meanders to East Rounton where it turns north-westerly and then westerly past Appleton Wiske. The river continues to flow westerly until just after passing under the A167 road near Great Smeaton where it turns south. It follows a mainly southerly direction towards Danby Wiske, Yafforth, and Northallerton. The river then alternates between a southerly and south-south-easterly direction until it passes Kirby Wiske, where it turns south-west to join the River Swale. Water from the river eventually enters the sea at Spurn Head at the mouth of the Humber Estuary.

History
During the drought of 1995/96 Yorkshire Water installed a pipeline connecting the River Tees near Darlington to the river near Birkby, south of Great Smeaton. It enables water to be transferred from the Tyne and Wear into the Tees and then to the Wiske for pumping out from the River Ouse at York. Although the pipeline was never used it was tested and remains as an "insurance policy". There are ongoing concerns about the biological impact of mixing water in Yorkshire's rivers.

The river is maintained by the Swale and Ure Internal Drainage Board. It was maintained by the River Wiske IDB until 2012 when five IDBs in the Vale of Mowbray and Hambleton District were combined into one.

The Wiske suffers from pollution and flooding problems. Pollution is high nitrogen content from the agricultural industry and excess water from the A19 flows into the river at its source. Flooding of villages on its route and its tributaries (such as Brompton near Northallerton) is a problem because of limited availability of land upstream to store water in times of high flow. The Environment Agency and the Yorkshire Wildlife Trust, have undertaken work along the course of the river to remediate the issues.

Geology

The River Wiske is underlain by a range of geological deposits, including undifferentiated sandstone, conglomerate, undifferentiated mudstone, siltstone and sandstone from the Triassic period, and the Lias group consisting of mudstone, siltstone, limestone and sandstone from the 
Mesozoic period.

Natural history

There are four non-statutory Nature Conservation Sites along the river: Middlebrough plantation just outside Newby Wiske; Stony Lane Pond near the confluence of Stony Lane Beck and Carr Beck; Pepper Arden Bottoms near East Cowton and Pheasantry Wood and Fox Covert near Danby Wiske.

The river passes through farmland bounded by hedgerows with some wet woodland near Kirby Wiske and some grassland near Newby Wiske. Biodiversity audits carried out in 2010 found European water vole on the river between Danby Wiske and Brompton Beck. European otters were found on the river between North Otterington and Kirby Wiske. Soprano pipistrelle and brown long-eared bat were also found in the area along with kingfisher, reed bunting and lapwing.

Lists

Tributaries

 East Rounton Stell
 Welbury Stell
 Carr Bridge Stell
 The Stell
 Willow Beck
 Howe Beck
 Spudling Dike
 Sike Stell

Settlements

 Ingleby Arncliffe
 East Rounton
 West Rounton
 Appleton Wiske
 Great Smeaton
 Birkby
 Hutton Bonville
 Danby Wiske
 Yafforth
 Northallerton
 Warlaby
 North Otterington
 Newby Wiske
 South Otterington
 Kirby Wiske

Crossings

 Baulk Bridge, Ingleby Arncliffe
 East Rounton Bridge, East Rounton
 West Rounton Bridge, West Rounton
 Wiske Railway Bridge, Middlesbrough branchline
 Wiske Bridge, Appleton Wiske
 Unnamed road near Hornby Grange Farm
 Smeaton Bridge, A167
 Unnamed road near Frigdale
 Wiske Bridge, Birkby
 Railway Bridge, East Coast Main Line
 Wiske Bridge, Danby Wiske
 Yafforth Bridge, B6271
 Wensleydale Railway Bridge
 Viewly Bridge, Ainderby Road, A684
 Howden Bridge, nr Romanby
 Unnamed road nr North Otterington
 Otterington Bridge, between Newby Wiske and South Otterington
 Kirby Bridge, Kirby Wiske
 Pivet Bridge (foot), nr Kirby Wiske

Gallery

References

Rivers of North Yorkshire